The 2011–12 Al-Hilal FC season was Al-Hilal Saudi Football Club's 55th in existence and 36th consecutive season in the top flight of Saudi Arabian football. Along with Pro League, the club participated in the AFC Champions League, Crown Prince Cup, and the King Cup.

Players

Squad information
Players and squad numbers.Note: Flags indicate national team as has been defined under FIFA eligibility rules. Players may hold more than one non-FIFA nationality.

Competitions

Overall

Notes
Note 1: Al-Hilal qualified to the quarter-finals.

Overview

Pro League

League table

Results summary

Results by round

Matches

Crown Prince Cup

King Cup of Champions

Quarter-finals

Semi-finals

Third place

2012 AFC Champions League

Group stage

Knockout stage

Round of 16

Statistics

Goalscorers

Assists

References

Al Hilal SFC seasons
Hilal